Perimeceta niphotypa is a moth in the family Crambidae. It was described by Turner in 1915. It is found in Australia, where it has been recorded from New South Wales.

References

Moths described in 1915
Hoploscopini